Bairnsdale Airport  is located  south west of Bairnsdale, Victoria, Australia, off the Princes Highway.

History

It was originally RAAF Station Bairnsdale, which was a training establishment formed during World War II. No. 1 Operational Training Unit (1OTU) and the General Reconnaissance School (GRS) were based there during the war years.

Operations 
The Airport, despite not having passenger service, is used regularly. It is heavily used by Air Ambulance for transporting patients. It also has small fleet maintenance facilities, and is a popular destination for numerous charter flights.

There have been proposals for regional passenger service to return to Bairnsdale to boost tourism in the East Gippsland Region, with flights to Melbourne, and possibly Albury and Sydney. However, these proposals have never became reality.

See also
 List of airports in Victoria

References

Airports in Victoria (Australia)
Bairnsdale